Earleen Sizemore (July 29, 1938 – August 20, 2014) was an American politician. She served as a Democratic member for the 136th district of the Georgia House of Representatives.

Life and career 
Sizemore was born in Worth County, Georgia, the daughter of Mamie Eloise Roberts Wilkerson and Joseph Earl Sizemore. She attended Georgia Southern University and the University of Georgia.

In 1975, Sizemore was elected to represent the 136th district of the Georgia House of Representatives, serving until 1989.

Sizemore died in August 2014, at the age of 76.

References 

1938 births
2014 deaths
People from Worth County, Georgia
Democratic Party members of the Georgia House of Representatives
20th-century American politicians
20th-century American women politicians
20th-century American women
21st-century American women
Georgia Southern University alumni
University of Georgia alumni